The New Lot is a 1943 British drama film directed by Carol Reed and starring Eric Ambler, Robert Donat, Kathleen Harrison, Bernard Lee, Raymond Huntley, John Laurie, Peter Ustinov and Austin Trevor, with music by Richard Addinsell. It is a short training film made for the Army Kinematograph Service, which follows five new recruits from different background and their experiences as they join the army.

The film was later expanded and remade as The Way Ahead, co-written by Ambler and Ustinov, directed by Carol Reed, and starring David Niven.

Cast
Eric Ambler as Bren Gun Instructor (uncredited)
Ivor Barnard as Photographer (uncredited)
Robert Donat as Actor (uncredited)
Ian Fleming as Medical Officer (uncredited)
Philip Godfrey as	Art Wallace (uncredited)
Kathleen Harrison as Keith's Mother (uncredited)
Bryan Herbert as Soldier (uncredited)
Raymond Huntley as Barrington (uncredited)
Mike Johnson as Railway Porter (uncredited)
Geoffrey Keen as Corporal (uncredited)
John Laurie as Harry Fyfe (uncredited)
Bernard Lee as Interviewing Officer (uncredited)
Albert Lieven as Czech Soldier (uncredited)
Bernard Miles as Ted Loman (uncredited)
Stewart Rome as Officer (uncredited)
Johnnie Schofield as Homeguard Sgt (uncredited)
John Slater as Soldier in Truck (uncredited)
Austin Trevor as Soldier Talking to Corporal (uncredited)
Peter Ustinov as Keith (uncredited)

References

External links
 

1943 films
Films directed by Carol Reed
British drama films
Films scored by Richard Addinsell
British black-and-white films
1943 drama films
1940s English-language films
1940s British films